The qualifying competition for the 2004 CONCACAF Men's Pre-Olympic Tournament determined the remaining seven teams for the final tournament.

First round

|}

Second round

|}

References 

 
Football qualification for the 2004 Summer Olympics
CONCACAF Men's Olympic Qualifying Tournament
Oly